Blackpink is the first Japanese extended play by South Korean girl group Blackpink. The EP was released in Japan  through YGEX on August 30, 2017, following digital pre-release on August 29. The six track EP consists of Japanese version of their previously released singles in Korean.

The EP debuted atop the Oricon Albums Chart in its daily and weekly charts. The group became the third foreign artist to top the chart with a debut release since 2011.

A reissue of the EP titled Re: Blackpink was released on March 28, 2018.

Background and composition 
In May 2017, it was reported that the group would be holding a debut showcase at Nippon Budokan on July 20 and would release their debut album on August 9. The Japanese-language EP compiles three singles previously released in Korean; "Square One" (containing "Boombayah" and "Whistle"), "Square Two" (containing "Playing with Fire" and "Stay") and "As If It's Your Last".

On July 13, it was officially announced that the debut album of the group would be an extended play called Blackpink and would be released on August 30. The music video of "Boombayah" was also released. On the same day, the details from the album were revealed, including the track list. It has two versions: CD+DVD, containing the Japanese and Korean-language versions of the group's singles plus five music videos; and only CD, containing just the Japanese-language songs. The Japanese-language EP compiles three singles previously released in Korean; "Square One" (containing "Boombayah" and "Whistle"), "Square Two" (containing "Playing with Fire" and "Stay") and "As If It's Your Last".

Promotion 
In order to promote the upcoming Japan debut on television and internet. The group released the full version of Japanese music video, starting with "Playing with Fire" on MTV Japan on July 10, 2017, "Whistle" on Music On! TV on July 10, 2017, "Stay" on GYAO! on July 11, 2017, "Boombayah" on GYAO! on July 13, 2017, and the last song, "As If It's Your Last" on AbemaTV (K World Channel) on July 16, 2017.

In addition, The group uploaded short versions of their singles in Japanese on the YouTube, starting with "Boombayah" on July 13, and continued with "Whistle" on July 14, "Playing with Fire" on July 15, "Stay" on July 16, and "As If It's Your Last" on July 17.

On August 8, the Japanese version of "Boombayah" was released on iTunes Japan as the promo single of the EP.

Commercial performance 
Blackpink debuted atop the Oricon Daily Album Chart on August 29, 2017, with 21,583 physical copies sold in its first day. In its second day, the EP stayed atop the chart. The EP debuted atop the Oricon Weekly Album Chart with 39,100 physical copies sold in its first week. They became the only third foreign artist to record first place on Oricon weekly chart with a debut release. The EP was the fourth best selling album in Japan for August 2017, with 39,100 copies sold.

The EP also topped Billboard Japan's Hot Albums chart for its combined sales.

Track listing 
All songs are Japanese versions unless specified.

Notes
 Kim Han-bin (B.I) has an uncredited contribution to the lyrics of "Whistle" on Japanese Society for Rights of Authors, Composers and Publishers (JASRAC).

Charts

Weekly charts

Monthly charts

Year-end charts

Release history

Footnotes

References

External links
 
 
 Oricon album profile
 

2017 debut EPs
Blackpink EPs
Japanese-language EPs
Avex Group EPs